Stenolophidius was a genus of beetles in the family Carabidae, but is now considered a subgenus of the genus Acupalpus Latreille, 1829.

References

Harpalinae